Arthur Gaillard (1847–1912) was the head of the State Archives in Belgium from 1904 until his death. His career as an archivist began in 1872 and he worked his way up through all the ranks of the service to become its head. He instituted the practice of publishing summary inventories of the collections, many of which he prepared himself. He is best known for fundamental work on the major institutions of the Habsburg Netherlands, in particular the Great Council of Mechelen and the Council of Brabant.

Publications
 Le Conseil de Brabant: Histoire – Organisation – Procédure (3 vols., Brussels, 1898–1902).
 Inventaire des mémoriaux du Grand Conseil de Malines (2 vols., Brussels, 1900–1903).

References

1847 births
1912 deaths
Belgian archivists
People from Ghent
Catholic University of Leuven (1834–1968) alumni